Boraginales is a valid taxonomic name at the rank of order for a group of flowering plants. It includes Boraginaceae and closely related asterid families. The Boraginales include about 125 genera, 2,700 species and its herbs, shrubs, trees and lianas (vines) have a worldwide distribution. In the 2016 APG IV system Boraginales is an order with only one family Boraginaceae, which includes the former family Codonaceae. At the time of the APG IV consensus there was insufficient support to divide this monophyletic group further.

The anthophytes are a grouping of plant taxa bearing flower-like reproductive structures. They were formerly thought to be a clade comprising plants bearing flower-like structures.  The group contained the angiosperms - the extant flowering plants, such as roses and grasses - as well as the Gnetales and the extinct Bennettitales.

23,420 species of vascular plant have been recorded in South Africa, making it the sixth most species-rich country in the world and the most species-rich country on the African continent. Of these, 153 species are considered to be threatened. Nine biomes have been described in South Africa: Fynbos, Succulent Karoo, desert, Nama Karoo, grassland, savanna, Albany thickets, the Indian Ocean coastal belt, and forests.

The 2018 South African National Biodiversity Institute's National Biodiversity Assessment plant checklist lists 35,130 taxa in the phyla Anthocerotophyta (hornworts (6)), Anthophyta (flowering plants (33534)), Bryophyta (mosses (685)), Cycadophyta (cycads (42)), Lycopodiophyta (Lycophytes(45)), Marchantiophyta (liverworts (376)), Pinophyta (conifers (33)), and Pteridophyta (cryptogams (408)).

One family is represented in the literature. Listed taxa include species, subspecies, varieties, and forms as recorded, some of which have subsequently been allocated to other taxa as synonyms, in which cases the accepted taxon is appended to the listing. Multiple entries under alternative names reflect taxonomic revision over time.

Boraginaceae 
Family: Boraginaceae

Afrotysonia 
Genus Afrotysonia:
 Afrotysonia africana (Bolus) Rauschert, endemic
 Afrotysonia glochidiata (R.R.Mill) R.R.Mill, indigenous

Amsinckia 
Genus Amsinckia:
 Amsinckia calycina (Moris) Chater, not indigenous
 Amsinckia menziesii (Lehm.) A.Nelson & J.F.Macbr. not indigenous
 Amsinckia retrorsa Suksd. not indigenous

Anchusa 
Genus Anchusa:
 Anchusa azurea Mill. not indigenous
 Anchusa capensis Thunb. indigenous
 Anchusa riparia A.DC. indigenous

Buglossoides 
Genus Buglossoides:
 Buglossoides arvensis (L.) I.M.Johnst. not indigenous

Codon 
Genus Codon:
 Codon royenii L. indigenous
 Codon schenckii Schinz, indigenous

Coldenia 
Genus Coldenia:
 Coldenia procumbens L. indigenous

Cordia 
Genus Cordia:
 Cordia africana Lam. indigenous
 Cordia caffra Sond. indigenous
 Cordia grandicalyx Oberm. indigenous
 Cordia monoica Roxb. indigenous
 Cordia ovalis R.Br. ex A.DC. indigenous
 Cordia quercifolia Klotzsch, indigenous
 Cordia sinensis Lam. indigenous

Cynoglossum 
Genus Cynoglossum:
 Cynoglossum alticola Hilliard & B.L.Burtt, indigenous
 Cynoglossum amabile Stapf & J.R.Drumm. not indigenous
 Cynoglossum austroafricanum Hilliard & B.L.Burtt, indigenous
 Cynoglossum geometricum Baker & C.H.Wright, indigenous
 Cynoglossum hispidum Thunb. indigenous
 Cynoglossum lanceolatum Forssk. indigenous
 Cynoglossum obtusicalyx Retief & A.E.van Wyk, endemic
 Cynoglossum spelaeum Hilliard & B.L.Burtt, indigenous

Echiostachys 
Genus Echiostachys:
 Echiostachys ecklonianus (H.Buek) Levyns, endemic
 Echiostachys incanus (Thunb.) Levyns, endemic
 Echiostachys spicatus (Burm.f.) Levyns, endemic

Echium 
Genus Echium:
 Echium candicans L.f. not indigenous; cultivated, invasive
 Echium plantagineum L. not indigenous, invasive
 Echium simplex DC. not indigenous
 Echium vulgare L. not indigenous, invasive

Ehretia 
Genus Ehretia:
 Ehretia alba Retief & A.E.van Wyk, indigenous
 Ehretia amoena Klotzsch, indigenous
 Ehretia obtusifolia Hochst. ex A.DC. indigenous
 Ehretia rigida (Thunb.) Druce, indigenous
 Ehretia rigida (Thunb.) Druce subsp. nervifolia Retief & A.E.van Wyk, indigenous
 Ehretia rigida (Thunb.) Druce subsp. rigida, endemic
 Ehretia rigida (Thunb.) Druce subsp. silvatica Retief & A.E.van Wyk, endemic

Heliotropium 
Genus Heliotropium:
 Heliotropium amplexicaule Vahl, not indigenous, invasive
 Heliotropium burmanni Roem. & Schult. accepted as Heliotropium tubulosum E.Mey. ex A.DC. present
 Heliotropium capense Lehm. accepted as Heliotropium supinum L. present
 Heliotropium ciliatum Kaplan, indigenous
 Heliotropium curassavicum L. not indigenous
 Heliotropium europaeum L. not indigenous, invasive
 Heliotropium giessii Friedr.-Holzh. indigenous
 Heliotropium hereroense Schinz, indigenous
 Heliotropium indicum L. not indigenous
 Heliotropium lineare (A.DC.) Gurke, indigenous
 Heliotropium nelsonii C.H.Wright, indigenous
 Heliotropium ovalifolium Forssk. indigenous
 Heliotropium steudneri Vatke, indigenous
 Heliotropium strigosum Willd. indigenous
 Heliotropium supinum L. not indigenous
 Heliotropium tubulosum E.Mey. ex A.DC. indigenous
 Heliotropium zeylanicum (Burm.f.) Lam. indigenous

Lappula 
Genus Lappula:
 Lappula capensis (A.DC.) Gurke, indigenous
 Lappula cynoglossoides (Lam.) Gurke, accepted as Lappula capensis (A.DC.) Gurke, present
 Lappula eckloniana Brand, accepted as Lappula capensis (A.DC.) Gurke, present
 Lappula heteracantha Ledeb. not indigenous
 Lappula squarrosa (L.) Dumort. subsp. heteracantha (Ledeb.) Chater, accepted as Lappula heteracantha Ledeb. not indigenous

Lithospermum 
Genus Lithospermum:
 Lithospermum affine A.DC. endemic
 Lithospermum afromontanum Weim. indigenous
 Lithospermum cinereum A.DC. indigenous
 Lithospermum diversifolium A.DC. indigenous
 Lithospermum flexuosum Lehm. indigenous
 Lithospermum hirsutum E.Mey. ex A.DC. endemic
 Lithospermum inornatum A.DC. accepted as Lithospermum cinereum A.DC. present
 Lithospermum papillosum Thunb. indigenous
 Lithospermum scabrum Thunb. endemic

Lobostemon 
Genus Lobostemon:
 Lobostemon argenteus (P.J.Bergius) H.Buek, endemic
 Lobostemon belliformis M.H.Buys, endemic
 Lobostemon bolusii Levyns, accepted as Lobostemon capitatus (L.) H.Buek, present
 Lobostemon capitatus (L.) H.Buek, endemic
 Lobostemon collinus Schltr. ex C.H.Wright, endemic
 Lobostemon curvifolius H.Buek, endemic
 Lobostemon daltonii M.H.Buys, endemic
 Lobostemon decorus Levyns, endemic
 Lobostemon echioides Lehm. endemic
 Lobostemon fruticosus (L.) H.Buek, endemic
 Lobostemon glaber (Vahl) H.Buek, endemic
 Lobostemon glaucophyllus (Jacq.) H.Buek, endemic
 Lobostemon gracilis Levyns, endemic
 Lobostemon grandiflorus (Andrews) Levyns, accepted as Lobostemon regulareflorus (Ker Gawl.) M.H.Buys, present
 Lobostemon hispidus DC. & A.DC. accepted as Lobostemon glaber (Vahl) H.Buek, present
 Lobostemon horridus Levyns, endemic
 Lobostemon hottentoticus Levyns, endemic
 Lobostemon inconspicuus Levyns, accepted as Lobostemon capitatus (L.) H.Buek, present
 Lobostemon laevigatus (L.) H.Buek, endemic
 Lobostemon lucidus (Lehm.) H.Buek, endemic
 Lobostemon marlothii Levyns, endemic
 Lobostemon montanus H.Buek, endemic
 Lobostemon muirii Levyns, endemic
 Lobostemon oederiaefolius A.DC. endemic
 Lobostemon paniculatus (Thunb.) H.Buek, endemic
 Lobostemon paniculiformis A.DC. endemic
 Lobostemon pearsonii Levyns, accepted as Lobostemon glaucophyllus (Jacq.) H.Buek, endemic
 Lobostemon regulareflorus (Ker Gawl.) M.H.Buys, endemic
 Lobostemon sanguineus Schltr. endemic
 Lobostemon stachydeus A.DC. indigenous
 Lobostemon strigosus (Lehm.) H.Buek, endemic
 Lobostemon trichotomus (Thunb.) DC. endemic
 Lobostemon trigonus (Thunb.) H.Buek, endemic

Myosotis 
Genus Myosotis:
 Myosotis afropalustris C.H.Wright, indigenous
 Myosotis arvensis (L.) Hill, not indigenous, invasive
 Myosotis discolor Pers. not indigenous
 Myosotis galpinii C.H.Wright, indigenous
 Myosotis graminifolia A.DC. indigenous
 Myosotis semiamplexicaulis A.DC. indigenous
 Myosotis stricta Link ex Roem. & Schult. not indigenous, invasive
 Myosotis sylvatica Hoffm. not indigenous

Phacelia 
Genus Phacelia:
 Phacelia artemisioides Griseb. not indigenous

Rochelia 
Genus Rochelia:
 Rochelia disperma (L.f.) K.Koch, not indigenous

Symphytum 
Genus Symphytum:
 Symphytum bulbosum K.F.Schimp. not indigenous

Trichodesma 
Genus Trichodesma:
 Trichodesma africanum (L.) Lehm. indigenous
 Trichodesma angustifolium Harv. indigenous
 Trichodesma angustifolium Harv. subsp. angustifolium, indigenous
 Trichodesma physaloides (Fenzl) A.DC. indigenous
 Trichodesma zeylanicum (Burm.f.) R.Br. indigenous

Wellstedia 
Genus Wellstedia:
 Wellstedia dinteri Pilg. indigenous
 Wellstedia dinteri Pilg. subsp. dinteri, indigenous
 Wellstedia dinteri Pilg. var. dinteri, accepted as Wellstedia dinteri Pilg. subsp. dinteri, present
 Wellstedia dinteri Pilg. var. gracilior Hunt, accepted as Wellstedia dinteri Pilg. subsp. gracilior (D.R.Hunt) Retief & A.E.van Wyk

Wigandia 
Genus Wigandia:
 Wigandia caracasana Kunth, accepted as Wigandia urens (Ruiz & Pav.) Kunth var. caracasana (Kunth) Gibson, not indigenous, invasive
 Wigandia urens (Ruiz & Pav.) Kunth var. caracasana (Kunth) Gibson, not indigenous, invasive

References

South African plant biodiversity lists
Asterids